One City Center is  is a 27-story mixed-use tower located at 110 Corcoran Street in Downtown Durham, North Carolina. One City Center is the tallest building in downtown Durham, and the second tallest in Durham behind University Tower. Completed in 2018, One City Center is partially leased to Duke University and WeWork.

References 

Skyscraper office buildings in North Carolina
Skyscrapers in Durham, North Carolina